Rick Falkvinge (born Dick Greger Augustsson on 21 January 1972) is a Swedish information technology entrepreneur and founder of the Swedish Pirate Party. He is currently a political evangelist with the party, spreading the ideas across the world.

Youth and early career 

Falkvinge grew up in Ruddalen, Gothenburg, and studied Natural Sciences at Göteborgs Högre Samskola. During his high school years, he was active in Moderat Skolungdom and Moderata Ungdomsförbundet, the youth wings of the Moderaterna party in Sweden. His passion for technology was visible at an early age, and he would spend time as a toddler just pressing doorbell buttons in electronics stores.

His first computer was a VIC-20, and then a Commodore 64, and created his first company, Infoteknik (literally Infotechnology), in 1988 at the age of 16. The inefficiency in administrative business tasks irritated him, and he wanted to digitize the world.

In 1994 to 1998, he was active as an entrepreneur with five employees in software development in Gothenburg, Kalmar and Strömsund. He changed his first name in 2004 from Dick to Rickard, with just Rick for short, and his last name from Augustsson to the current Falkvinge (literally Falconwing).

The Pirate Party 

In the Fall of 2005, Rick Falkvinge started to consider creating a political party focused on the issues of file sharing, copyright, and patents. The dominating Swedish organization in the copyright debate at this time was the Pirate Bureau, which was not affiliated with any party. On 16 December 2005, Falkvinge registered the domain name piratpartiet.se (literally The Pirate Party), and on 1 January 2006, the party's web site was launched through a message on a Direct Connect hub, signaling the start of the petition to register a new political party in Sweden. According to the party, the site got three million hits in the first two days, and in the morning of 2 January, the newspaper Dagens Industri published a notice about the initiative, followed by a longer article in the tabloid Aftonbladet after lunch. Falkvinge took out a large bank loan, quit his job at Cypak, and started working with building the Pirate Party full-time.

Raid against The Pirate Bay 

Following the raid on The Pirate Bay on 31 May 2006, Falkvinge mobilized every part of the Pirate Party, and in the protests that followed on June 3, he held his first widely translated and acclaimed speech, "Nothing new under the Sun".

In the week that followed the raid, Falkvinge was on the TV news daily, and Pirate Party membership tripled from 2,200 to 6,600.

General elections in 2006 

In the general elections in 2006, the Pirate Party achieved 0.63%. Falkvinge was noticeably downcast when the exit polls arrived during the election night party, but promised the gathered people that this would not be the end of the fight.

He led the Pirate Party while living off of donations and charity from supporters for 18 months, until he was hired by the European Parliament following entry.

Success in European Elections 

The success in the European Elections in 2009, where the Pirate Party achieved 7.13% under his leadership, catapulted Falkvinge and the top candidate Christian Engström onto every newspaper front page in the country, as well as making the top news on CNN, headlines on BBC, Reuters and others. Media described the election night party as ecstatic as the Pirate Party became the largest party by far for voters under 30, with 25% of those votes.

Falkvinge called this success a re-ignition for the civil liberties fight in Europe and the world.

Not long after the European Elections, media predicted that the Pirate Party was also on its way into Swedish Parliament, as they got 3.9% support in a poll. The threshold for entry is 4.0%. This support did not materialize in the 2010 parliamentary elections.

Controversies 
In the launch of the party's election manifesto in 2010, Falkvinge stated that freedom of speech and freedom of the press should take precedence over the current ban on possession of drawings potentially depicting Child Sexual Abuse Materials (CSAM), and that the party wanted to repeal current legislation on the topic. This followed a Swedish court case where a manga researcher and translator was indicted for possession of a handful of drawings as part of a very large manga collection. The Swedish Union of Journalists openly and immediately proclaimed their support for this stance, and the irrationality of a law which persecuted individuals of a crime with no victim. Despite this, the stance created internal controversy in the Pirate Party and Falkvinge initially backed away from his position, before reiterating it in 2012.

Stepping down as party leader 

On 1 January 2011, five years after the party's foundation, Falkvinge announced that he was stepping down as party leader, and that deputy party leader Anna Troberg would step into the role. This announcement was done during a live broadcast.

In February 2016, it was announced that Falkvinge had accepted a full-time role as head of privacy for Private Internet Access, a US-based personal VPN service.

Awards and recognition 

In 2012, TIME Magazine shortlisted Falkvinge as one of the world's most influential people, and The Guardian listed Falkvinge as one of the world's Top 20 Internet Freedom Fighters.

In 2011, The magazine Foreign Policy named Falkvinge as one of the Top 100 Global Thinkers.

Falkvinge was awarded the Swedish Guldmusen award as IT person of the year 2010, citing his successes in bringing the Net and its consequences to the political table.

He has been listed as one of the 100 most influential people in Sweden by Fokus magazine.

Personal life 

Falkvinge lives in Sollentuna, a suburb north of Stockholm.

References

External links 

 
 Rickard Falkvinge on TorrentFreak

1972 births
Living people
People from Gothenburg
Pirate Party (Sweden) politicians
Swedish computer programmers
Swedish businesspeople
Swedish bloggers
Intellectual property activism
Copyright activists